Larry DeGraw (born c. 1941) is a retired Canadian football player who played for the Ottawa Rough Riders and Saskatchewan Roughriders. He played college football at the University of Utah.

References

Living people
1940s births
American football halfbacks
American football defensive backs
Canadian football running backs
Canadian football defensive backs
Utah Utes football players
Ottawa Rough Riders players
Saskatchewan Roughriders players